The East Coast Railway (abbreviated ECoR) is one of the 19 railway zones of Indian Railways. It came into existence on 1 April 2003. The headquarters of the zone are at Bhubaneswar, Odisha

History
Consequent upon the parliament's approval, East Coast Railway was the first of the seven new zones to be inaugurated by the then Prime Minister of India H. D. Deve Gowda on 8 August 1996. The Officer-on-Special Duty took over charge of the newly declared Zone on 16 September 1996. Initially, only one division namely Khurda Road was attached to this railway.

Subsequently, the zone became fully operational on 1 April 2003. The Waltair division was notified to be bifurcated from the East Coast Railway zone on 27 February 2019. The Odisha section of Waltair division will constitute the new Rayagada division, while the Andhra Pradesh section will be a part of the South Coast Railway zone upon operationalization.

Divisions
The geographical jurisdiction of East Coast Railway zone extends over three states encompassing almost all of Odisha and Bastar, Mahasamund and Dantewada districts of Chhattisgarh and a minor part [Palasa, Sompeta and seven other stations] of Srikakulam district in Andhra Pradesh. The zonal headquarters is at Bhubaneswar in Odisha.

The zone has three divisions: Sambalpur, Khurda Road and Waltair.

The Rayagada railway division has been proposed to succeed a section of the existing Waltair division which will remain in the East Coast Railway zone upon bifurcation.

Electrification
As of 31 December 2021, it is one of the three 100% electric railway zones in India. The East Coast Railway line integrated with the commissioned Howrah-Chennai electrified trunk route on 29 November 2005. There was a missing link between Kharagpur and Visakhapatnam stations and all trains from Howrah towards Chennai side had to undergo a locomotive change from electric to diesel at Kharagpur and vice versa at Visakhapatnam in order to pass through Odisha. Even trains from New Delhi such as the Bhubaneswar Rajdhani had to undergo the change at Kharagpur. This frequent loco change on a trunk route became a time-consuming and inconvenient process. With electrification along the 765 km Kharagpur-Visakhapatnam stretch, trains got speeded up and the need for double headed diesels for high speed express trains was eliminated thus saving on diesel consumption and a cleaner travel. Additionally the line branching off Khurda road towards Puri was also electrified. Gradually the Cuttack-Angul line, Cuttack-Paradeep line and branch line from Jakhapura towards Barbil got electrified too.

Major railway stations 
The major railway stations in the entire zone are  Bhubaneswar, Cuttack, Chatrapur, Puri, Sambalpur, Khurda Road, Balugaon, Rayagada, Brahmapur, Angul, Dhenkanal, Bhadrak, Balangir, Jajpur Keonjhar Road, Titilagarh, Koraput, Mahasamund, Jagdalpur, Kendujhargarh, Palasa and Barbil.

Most of the major stations fall in the state of Odisha, Chhattisgarh.

Gallery

Rail infrastructure
 Electric Loco Shed – Angul
 Carriage Repair Workshop – Mancheswar, Bhubaneswar
 MEMU Shed – Khurda Road

Routes
East Coast Railway zone has about 273 railway stations with a track length of 5214 km spread as follows:-

Railway lines
ECoR zone has below tracks. All are  broad gauge. The sections are:-

 Bhadrak-Bhubaneswar-Khurda Road- Double Electrified BG line [92 Railway stations]
 Talcher-Cuttack Double Electrified BG line [21 Railway stations]

 Titlagarh Junction-Mahasamund Single Electrified BG line [15 Railway stations] (Electric doubling of this line is currently underway)
 Cuttack-Paradip Double Electrified BG line [10 Railway stations]
 Khurda road-Puri Double Electrified BG line [11 Railway stations]
 Sambalpur Junction-Talcher Single Electrified BG line [16 Railway stations](Electric doubling of this line is currently underway)
 Titlagarh Junction-Sambalpur Junction Single Electrified BG line [16 Railway stations] (Electric doubling of this line is currently underway)
 Sambalpur Junction-Jharsuguda Junction Double Electrified BG line [10 Railway stations] 
 Rayagada-Koraput Single Electric BG line [15 Railway stations]
Naupada Junction-Gunupur Single Diesel BG line [14 Railway stations]
Jakhapura Junction-Banspani Single Electrified BG line [17 Railway stations] (Electric doubling of this line is currently underway)

Loco sheds
 Electric Loco Shed, Visakhapatnam
 Electric Loco Shed, Angul
 Diesel Loco Shed, Visakhapatnam

External links
 East Coast Railway Official Website
  Khurda Road Division
  Sambalpur Division
  Waltair Division

See also

 All India Station Masters' Association (AISMA)
 Zones and divisions of Indian Railways
 Indian Railway Signal Maintainers Union (IRSTMU)
 South Coast Railway

References

 
Zones of Indian Railways
Rail transport in Odisha
Rail transport in Andhra Pradesh
2003 establishments in India